The 2018 United States Mixed Doubles Curling Championship was held from January 17-21 at the Eau Claire Curling Club in Eau Claire, Wisconsin. Sarah Anderson and Korey Dropkin won the tournament, earning the right to represent the United States at the 2018 World Mixed Doubles Curling Championship in Östersund, Sweden.

Teams
The following 22 teams competed in the event:

Round robin

Standings

Game results

Tiebreaker (Pool C)
Saturday, January 20, 12:00 noon

Tiebreaker (Pool D)
Saturday, January 20, 12:00 noon

Saturday, January 20, 4:00 pm

Playoffs

Bracket

Quarterfinals
Saturday, January 20, 8:00pm

Semifinals
Sunday, January 21, 10:00am

Finals
Sunday, January 21, 2:00pm

References

United States Mixed Doubles
United States National Curling Championships
Curling Mixed Doubles Championship
Curling in Wisconsin
United States